George Barrell Cheever (April 7, 1807 – October 1, 1890) was a well-known and controversial abolitionist minister and writer. Born at Hallowell, Maine; his parents were Nathanial Cheever and Charlotte Barrell Cheever. He was a graduate of Bowdoin College, where he was a classmate of Nathanial Hawthorne and Henry W. Longfellow, and Andover Theological Seminary. In 1821 he became pastor of the Howard Street Congregational Church in Salem, Massachusetts. In 1838 he became pastor of the Allen Street Presbyterian Church, in New York City, and in 1846 the new Congregational Church of the Puritans. New York City. In 1846 he married Elizabeth Hoppin Wetmore Cheever (1814–1886); they had no children. He died at his home in Englewood, New Jersey, and is buried in Green-Wood Cemetery, Brooklyn, New York. He was survived by a brother, Rev. Henry T. Cheever, and a sister, Mrs. Ichabod Washburn, both of Worcester, Mass.

He was a leader of the Christian Abolitionist Movement.  His best-known works, which went through multiple editions and are held by hundreds of libraries, are:

 
 
He was also a leader in the American Temperance Society. In 1833, he published:

 "The Temperance Reformation. Fifth Report of the American Temperance Society. Presented at the meeting in Boston, May 1832" in The American Quarterly Observer. July 1833.

Edgar Allan Poe famously remarked on Cheever: "He is much better known, however, as the editor of The Commonplace Book of American Poetry, a work which has at least the merit of not belying its title, and is exceedingly commonplace".

References

1807 births
1890 deaths
19th-century Congregationalist ministers
19th-century Presbyterian ministers
American abolitionists
American Congregationalist ministers
American male non-fiction writers
American Presbyterian ministers
Andover Theological Seminary alumni
Bowdoin College alumni
Congregationalist abolitionists
People from Englewood, New Jersey
People from Hallowell, Maine
People from New York City
People from Salem, Massachusetts
19th-century American clergy
Burials at Green-Wood Cemetery
American book editors